Eney was a Ukrainian rock band that performed its own repertoire. It was named after the famous character, Aeneas, from one of the literal works of Ivan Kotlyarevsky.

History
During the 1960s Students from the Kyivan special music school formed a band named after Ukrainian composer Mykola Lysenko. They initially played unique interpretations of Ukrainian folk songs. Later its members were exposed to the late works of The Beatles and started to rearrange works of Bach and Khachaturian. In 1971 the band split as Petrynenko and Blinov left it to form the new band called Dzvony. The band started to experiment in new genres: blues and soul. In 1972 the band and their music where banned in the Soviet Union and labeled "bourgeois-national". As a result, all existing records and recordings were destroyed. After that the band went underground until 1974. The members then merged with Dzvony into the new vocal-instrumental ensemble Decorative Trails. After the band was accepted to the Ukr-kontsert it changed its name to Hrono. In 1977 the ensemble became known as Eney once again. After a period of time, Eney broke up and its members either joined different bands or went solo. Petrynenko later created his own band Hrono.

External links
Brief overview

Soviet rock music groups
Ukrainian rock music groups